Vibes may refer to:

 Vibes (percussion) or vibraphone, a musical instrument
 Vibes (company) a mobile marketing company
 The aura or energy given off by someone

Media
 Vibes (film), a 1988 comedy
 Vibes (video game), a 2010 video game by Laughing Jackal

Music
 Vibes (soundtrack), a 1988 soundtrack album from the film
 Vibes (Heavy D album), a 2008 album by Heavy D
 Vibes (Theophilus London album), a 2014 album by Theophilus London
 "Vibes", a song by Tove Lo from Lady Wood
 "Vibes", a song by the band Six60

See also 
 Vybz Kartel (born 1976), Jamaican dancehall artist and lyricist
 Vibe (disambiguation)
 Vibez (disambiguation)
 Gathering of the Vibes, a festival that celebrates the Grateful Dead